Mission Discovery is an international education program run for teenagers in many countries around the world. The programme started in 2011 in King's College London, England, and has since expanded to Australia, the US, India and other countries.

Mission discovery is run and directed by ISSET (International Space School Educational Trust), a registered UK charity founded in 1998 by Chris Barber.
So far there have been 15 successful programs: one in India, twelve in the UK and two in the US. Each program has given the students the chance to work with space scientists while they work as a team designing experiments. As part of this program, at least one experiment designed by the students is sent to, and carried out on, the International Space Station.

Format
Mission Discovery is a week-long event in which the pupils are split into random groups to design an experiment that could be launched into space. During this week the teams are involved in exercises designed to develop their leadership, team building, and personal development skills, while also giving them an insight into scientific fields with a relation to space. The pupils will also hear talks from various astronauts, scientists and people from fields outside of science, covering topics including biomedical and scientific research done by NASA, and the astronaut's experiences in space, as well as topics like public speaking and how to suitably present information. Towards the end of the week, the program is more focused on the design of the students' experiments. The students are given time to design an experiment they believe could work in space and are then tasked with presenting it in both, an informative and interesting way. On the final day, the pupils present their ideas to other colleagues and mentors as well as different scientists, doctors, and professors from universities. The winning idea has their experiment designed and sent to the International Space Station where astronauts there will carry out experiments.

So far there have been twenty different winning experiments. Each is then further designed with help from researchers and scientists. After a lengthy process of designing the experiment, the winning team is invited to watch the rocket launch carrying their experiment to the International Space Station. These experiments are then carried out by the current astronauts on board the ISS. Depending on the complexity and the issues with the experiments, they normally take up three years to be launched and carried out on board the ISS.

Previous programmes

People involved
Scientists involved in the program have included:

Astronauts
 Michael Foale

Space time : ~ 374 days in space

Area of study : Astrophysicist

Mission discoveries attended: 2014 - 2016 King’s College London, England, 2016 Renfrewshire, Scotland, 2016 Ayrshire, Scotland

 Steven Swanson

Space time : ~ 196 days in space

Area of study : Engineer

Mission discoveries attended: 2016 Shiv Nadar School, India

 Scott Kelly

Space time : ~ 570 days in space

 Kenneth Ham

Space time : ~ 25 days in space

Area of study : Test pilot

Mission discoveries attended: 2012 - 2014 King’s College London, England, 2014 Renfrewshire, Scotland, 2014 Valparaiso University

 Stephen G. Bowen

Space time : ~ 40 days in space

Area of study : Engineer

Mission discoveries attended: 2015 Renfrewshire, Scotland, UK

 Jean-Jacques Favier

Space time : ~ 16 days in space

 Nicole Stott

Space time : ~ 106 days in space

Area of study : Engineer

Mission discoveries attended: 2014 Embry Riddle Aeronautical University, US

 Yi So-Yeon

Space Time : ~ 10 days in space

Area of study : Naval aviator , Test pilot , Engineer

 Michael J. McCulley

Space time : ~ 4 days in space

Area of study : Researcher

 Jerry L. Ross

Space time : ~ 58 days in space

Area of study : Flight Engineer

 Ken Bowersox

Space Time : ~ 211 days in space

Area of study : Test pilot

'Mission discoveries attended: 2015 Caerphilly, Wales

Nasa personnel
 Sarah Murray, Assistant chief of EVA, Robotics and Crew Systems
 Jay F. Honeycutt, former director of Kennedy Space Center

Scientists
 Dr. Julie Keeble, Pharmacology, King's College London
 Prof. Steve Harridge, Human and Applied Physiology, King's College London
 Dr. James Clarke, Human and Applied Physiology, King's College London
 Dr. David Green, Human and Aerospace Physiology, King's College London

Completion

On completion of the program, the winning team then has to wait and go through the process of their experiment idea being built from only their design. This is a process which involves the team working with a scientist who helps them make their experiment suitable for the space station, because what the students choose, meaning the specifics, isn't always the best way for it to be done.

An example of this process in the team which won the program in Renfrewshire in 2014. For this group, the process of their ideas becoming the real thing lasted two years. This is because the experiment wasn't launched until the summer of 2016. During these two years, the team met up on a few occasions for events as well as experiment discussion sessions. The main experiment discussion session was held in 2014 when the team met with pharmacology lecturer from King's College London, Julie Keeble, who was the main scientist involved in the development of their experiment. This session took place at the University of the West of Scotland, where they spend time in the labs finding out how their experiment would be built and any changes that would need to be made to it. During the period between the first meeting and the launch, the students were also invited to an event which involved astronaut Mike Foale. The students took part in the day which involved meeting with Foale and listening to the talk he gave to the prospectus students for the 2015 program. These two above events were the main two events the students were involved in before their launch in the summer of 2016.

This example is similar to most programs run by ISSET.

See also

Australian Space Agency

References

External links
 ISSET Homepage
 ISSET Blog

Space program of the United States
Space programme of the United Kingdom
Space programme of India
Space programme of Australia
Space camps
Educational programs